Suhan Babaýewyç Babaýew (27 November 1910 – 28 November 1995) was a Soviet and Turkmen politician. He served as the general secretary of the Communist Party of Turkmenistan from October 1951 to December 1958.

Babayev and several political allies were fired after they advocated greater ethnic Turkmen representation in the Soviet government.

Notes

References

1910 births
1995 deaths
Turkmenistan politicians
Soviet politicians
People from Transcaspian Oblast
First secretaries of the Communist Party of Turkmenistan
Second convocation members of the Supreme Soviet of the Soviet Union
Third convocation members of the Supreme Soviet of the Soviet Union
Fourth convocation members of the Supreme Soviet of the Soviet Union
Fifth convocation members of the Supreme Soviet of the Soviet Union
Central Committee of the Communist Party of the Soviet Union members
Recipients of the Order of Lenin
Recipients of the Order of the Red Banner of Labour
Recipients of the Order of the Red Star
Heads of government of the Turkmen Soviet Socialist Republic
People's commissars and ministers of the Turkmen Soviet Socialist Republic